Hermínio Francisco de Oliveira Filho (18 July 1944 – 23 April 2010), known as Minuca, was a Brazilian football player.

He played club football for Santa Cruz, América-RJ, Palmeiras and Marília. Minuca played in 194 matches for Palmeiras from 1965 to 1972, and won the Campeonato Paulista in 1966 and the Torneio Roberto Gomes Pedrosa and Taça Brasil in 1967 with the club.

References

External links
Profile at Globo Esporte's Futpedia

1944 births
2010 deaths
Brazilian footballers
Santa Cruz Futebol Clube players
Sociedade Esportiva Palmeiras players
America Football Club (RJ) players
Marília Atlético Clube players
Association football defenders
Sportspeople from Recife